is a Japanese professional footballer who plays as a winger for Sanfrecce Hiroshima and the Japan national team.

Career statistics

Club
.

Notes

Honours

Club
Sanfrecce Hiroshima
 J.League Cup: 2022

References

1999 births
Living people
People from Kumamoto
Association football people from Kumamoto Prefecture
Ryutsu Keizai University alumni
Japanese footballers
Association football forwards
Sanfrecce Hiroshima players